Sunnybrook Park may refer to:

Canada 

 Sunnybrook Park, a park in Toronto, Ontario, Canada
 Sunnybrook Park stop, an LRT station on the Eglinton Crosstown that will open in 2021

United States 

 Sunnybrook State Park, a state park in Torrington, Connecticut, United States

See also 

 Sunnybrook (disambiguation)